Ingo Kunzi (born 7 November 1966) is a German trance producer and DJ, best known for his work under his recording names Ayla and Tandu. The Ayla name was inspired by the name of a girl in the recording studio during his first Ayla recording. Kunzi is also related to other projects including Karuma, Elastique Culture, Tarot and Intrance.

Career 
Ingo Kunzi was born in 1966 in Baden-Württemberg, Germany. Influenced by the likes of Supertramp and Pat Metheny, he started out in the rock scene, building his own studio in 1985 and engineering demos for rock bands before discovering electronic music via the likes of Cosmic Baby and Talla 2XLC's Moskwa TV project. In 1994, Kunzi launched his DJ Tandu alias with the "Acido" EP, his first foray into full-on trance, with a hard, psychedelic sound. His second project, Ayla, was created in 1995 along with the single of the same name: the track became a hit in the clubs and entered the UK Singles Chart at #22 in September 1999. After "Ayla's" success, Kunzi produced "Atlantis", "Ayla Part II" and "Liebe", which is a cover of the Cosmic Baby classic.

Ayla's fifth single, "Angelfalls", was released in 1999, reaching the top 3 of the German dance chart. In the same year, Ayla released his first album, Nirwana. His remix of Lange's "I Believe", which was released under the name DJ Tandu, was included in the first installment of Tiësto's popular series In Search of Sunrise as well as in Gatecrasher Wet, the third compilation album by Sheffield-based club Gatecrasher. Kunzi went on to produce two more Ayla tracks ("Singularity / Brainchild II", "Sun Is Coming Out"), before taking a break on the project in 2002. He has also co-produced for several known successful electronic acts such as Safri Duo and DJ Encore.

After putting his Ayla project on hiatus for many years, Kunzi released the digital single, "Ayla 2010", in 2010. On 23 February 2011, the second Ayla studio album, Unreleased Secrets, was released. Together with friends and colleagues Torsten Stenzel (York) and Ralph-Armand Beck (DJ Taucher), Ingo - as Ayla - released two singles in 2015 'Kings & Queens' and 'Free Yourself'.

In 2018 Ingo released his debut Tandu album 'Faces', a collaboration with long-term friend and colleague Ralph-Armand Beck (aka. Taucher).

Discography

As Ayla

Studio albums
1999 – Nirwana
2011 – Unreleased Secrets

Singles & EPs
1995 – Ayla
1996 – Atlantis
1998 – Ayla Part II
1998 – Liebe
1999 – Angelfalls
1999 – Into The Light
2000 – Singularity (Brainchild II)
2002 – Sun Is Coming Out (with Yel)
2004 – Eternity (with Orion)
2015 – Kings & Queens (with York & Taucher)
2015 – Free Yourself (with York & Taucher)

Remixes
1998 – DJ Sakin & Friends - Protect Your Mind (For the Love of a Princess) (Ayla Remix)
1999 – Schiller - Ruhe (Ayla Mix)
1999 – Pearls - When Winter Calls... (Ayla Remix)
1999 – Watergate - Chi Mai (Ayla Remix)
1999 – Malatya 44 - Wonderland (Ayla Mix)
2000 – U:Phonics - Running (Ayla's Particular Beach Remix)
2000 – DJ Tandu Presents Ayla - Singularity (Brainchild II) (Ayla's Club Mix)
2000 – DJ Piero - I Can't Stop Lovin' You (Ayla Remix)
2000 – Degeneration - Una Musica Senza Ritmo 2000 (Ayla Remix)
2001 – Schiller Mit Heppner - Dream Of You (Ayla Mischung)
2001 – Orion - Eternity (Ayla Mix)
2002 – Ayla Presents Yel - Sun Is Coming Out (Ayla's Uplifting Mix)
2003 – Hiver & Hammer - 5 Million Miles (Ayla Remix)
2005 – DJ's United For Asia - Broken Dreams (Ayla Remix)
2010 – Ayla - Ayla 2010 (Ayla 2010 Mix)

As Tandu

Studio albums
2018 - Faces (with Taucher)

Singles & EPs
1994 – Acido EP
1994 – Beridox (with Trex)
1997 – The Marillion (with Karuma)
1998 – Back!
1999 – Velvet
2000 – On Y Va (with DJ Mind-X & Karuma)
2004 – Mansonate (with Taucher)
2005 – Turn It Around Baby (with Niels Van Gogh)
2009 – Firedance (with Mike Mash)
2014 - Addicted To You (with McLoud)

Remixes
1995 – Pan & Trex - Iceman On The Beach (Tandu Remix)
1997 – DJ Pascal Dollé - Thunderstorm (...Paranoia Around My Brain...) (Club Mix) (remix by Tandu)
1997 – Delgado - Feel The Bass Pumpin' (Tandu Remix)
1998 – Pathfinder - Mars (Tandu Remix)
1998 – Elastique Culture - La Muzika (DJ Tandu Remix)
1998 – Marino Stephano - Eternal Rhapsody (DJ Tandu Remix)
1998 – A.M.C. - Nippon Nippel II (DJ Tandu Remix)
1999 - Mosquito Headz – El Ritmo (Tandu Mix)
1999 – Ayla - Ayla (Tandu Remix)
1999 – Lange - I Believe (DJ Tandu Mix)
1999 – Pulp Victim - The World 99 (DJ Tandu Remix)
1999 – Mythos 'N DJ Cosmo - Send Me An Angel (Tandu Remix)
1999 – Andora - Blade Runner (Tandu Remix)
1999 – DJ Mind-X - Nightingale (Tandu Remix)
1999 - Minimalism – For My Love (Tandu Mix)
1999 - Rise & Shine – Hungry Animal (Tandu Remix)
1999 - The Highlander – Emotional Overload (Dj Tandu Original 95 Mix)
1999 - DJ D.O.C. - Entspannungstherapie (DJ Tandu & Allan McLoud Therapie)
2000 - DJ ELB – Relieve My Pain (Dj Tandu & Allan Mc Loud Remix)
2000 - Encore – Le Soleil Noir (Tandu~McLoud Remix)
2000 - Kai Tracid - Destiny's Path (Tandu Remix)
2000 - Voyager - On A Mission (DJ Tandu & Allan McLoud Remix)
2000 - The Untamed – Innocent Child (Tandu Remix)
2000 - S-Project – Julika (Feelings Like In Paradise)(Tandu~McLoud Remix)
2000 - Elastique Culture – U (Dj Tandu Mix)
2000 - Safri Duo – Played-A-Live (The Bongo Song)(Dj Tandu Mix)
2001 - Mario De Bellis – City Lights (Tandu Remix)
2001 - DJ Tatana & DJ Energy - Feel (DJ Tandu Progressive Mix)
2001 - Infernal - Muzaik (Tandu Remix) 
2001 - DJ Encore feat. Engelina – I See Right Through To You (Tandu Mix)
2001 - Neo Cortex – Prepare (DJ Tandu Remix)
2001 - Future Breeze – Mind In Motion (Tandu Remix)
2001 - DJ Delgado - Feel The Bass Pumpin'(DJ Tandu Mix)
2001 - Polar Lander – Polar Lander (Tandu & Mc Loud Remix)
2001 - Shine - Feelings (DJ Tandu Remix)
2002 - G.U.M. – This Is Not A Lovesong (Tandu Remix)
2002 - Matanka – Lost In A Dream (2002) (DJ Tandu Remix)
2002 - Catch – Keep On (Singing Lala) (DJ Tandu Remix)
2002 - DJ Aligator Project – Stomp! (Tandu Remix)
2003 - Ayla presents Yel - Sun is Coming Out (Tandu's UK Dub)
2003 - Wellenrausch – On The Run (Tandu meets Andy B. Remix)
2003 - Laze – Steppin' Out (Tandu Remix)
2003 - DJ Quicksilver – Equinoxe IV (Tandu Remix)
2004 - Marie Miller – Tell Me (DJ Tandu Remix)
2004 - Marie Miller – Playground (DJ Tandu Remix)
2005 - Marie Miller – Can't Slow Down (Tandu Remix)
2009 - Soulcry – A Life So Changed Part II (DJ Tandu Remix)
2009 - Michael Parsberg - Naked In The Rain (Tandu & Mike Mash Remix)
2014 - Dito – Shadows (Tandu's Good Old Days Remix)
 ? -   Fabuland – Space Trash (Tandu Remix)

DJ Mixes
2000 – Academy of Trance: Club Gorgeous.dk Vol. 2 
2001 – Techno Club Vol. 13 (with Talla 2XLC)

References

External links

Ayla / DJ Tandu discography at Discogs

Living people
1966 births
German record producers
German male songwriters
German DJs
German electronic musicians
German trance musicians
Remixers
Musicians from Baden-Württemberg
Electronic dance music DJs